A mirage of an astronomical object is a meteorological optical phenomenon, in which light rays are bent to produce distorted or multiple images of an astronomical object. The mirages might be observed for such celestial objects as the Sun, the Moon, the planets, bright stars, and very bright comets. The most commonly observed of these are sunset and sunrise mirages.

Mirages versus refraction
Mirages are distinguished from other phenomena caused by atmospheric refraction. One of the most prominent features of mirages is that a mirage might only produce images vertically, not sideways, while a simple refraction might distort and bend the images in any way.

The distortion in both images displayed in this section was caused by refraction, but while the image on the left, which is a mirage, demonstrates only vertical distortion, the image on the right demonstrates distortion in all the ways possible. It is easier to see the vertical direction of the mirage not even at the mirage of the Sun itself, but rather at the mirage of a sunspot. As a matter of fact, it is at least a three-image mirage of a sunspot, and all these images show a clear vertical direction.

Inferior mirage of astronomical objects

Inferior mirage of astronomical objects is the most common mirage. Inferior mirage occurs when the surface of the Earth or the oceans produces a layer of hot air of lower density, just at the surface. There are two images, the inverted one and the erect one, in inferior mirage. They both are displaced from the geometric direction to the actual object. While the erect image is setting, the inverted image appears to be rising from the surface.

The shapes of inferior mirage sunsets and sunrises stay the same for all inferior mirage sunsets and sunrises. One well-known shape, the Etruscan vase, was named by Jules Verne.
As the sunset progresses the shape of Etruscan vase slowly changes; the stem of the vase gets shorter until the real and the miraged Suns create a new shape – Greek letter omega Ω. The inferior mirage got its name because the inverted image appears
below the erect one.

Here's how Jules Verne describes an inferior mirage sunset.

On very rare occasions the mirages of astronomical objects other than the Sun and the Moon might be observed. An apparent magnitude of an astronomical object should be low enough (that is, bright enough) in order to see it as not only a real object, but also a miraged one.

Mock mirage of astronomical objects

A mock mirage of astronomical objects is much more complex than an inferior mirage. While an inferior mirage of astronomical objects can produce only two images, a mock mirage can produce multiple miraged images. The shapes of the miraged object are changing constantly and unpredictably. In order for a mock mirage to appear, the cooler air needs to be trapped below the inversion. Several inversion layers produce multiple pancake-like shapes.

It is possible that the solar anomaly mentioned in the Book of Joshua may have been an example of a mock mirage. In that tale, Joshua launched a surprise attack on the Amorites following a night march, causing the Amorites to panic and flee as far as Beth-horon, but they did not find a safe haven there. "...they were more who died with the hailstones than they whom the children of Israel slew with the sword." Hailstones are a rare event in deserts and are a good precondition for creating a mock/superior mirage of the setting sun. Inferior mirage is the most common mirage in the deserts. When the Israelites went from a hot desert to a hail-covered desert to fight the Amorites, the inversion layers could have created a mock mirage of the setting sun. To the Israelites, the sun would then have appeared to stand still. A poem is quoted from the Book of Jasher, which states that the sun stood still at Gibeon, and the moon in the valley of Ajalon, in order that Joshua could complete the battle.

Novaya Zemlya effect

Due to a normal atmospheric refraction, sunrise occurs shortly before the Sun crosses above the horizon. Light from the Sun is bent, or refracted, as it enters earth's atmosphere. This effect causes the apparent sunrise to be earlier than the actual sunrise. Similarly, apparent sunset occurs slightly later than actual sunset.

In ordinary atmospheric conditions, the setting or rising Sun appears to be about half a degree above its geometric position. But sometimes, very unusual atmospheric circumstances can make it to be visible when it is really between two and five degrees below the horizon. This is called the Novaya Zemlya effect, because it was first observed in Novaya Zemlya, where the Sun was seen when, according to astronomical calculations, it should have been two degrees below the horizon.

However, due to changes in air pressure, relative humidity, and other quantities, the exact effects of atmospheric refraction on sunrise and sunset time cannot be predicted. Also note that this possible error increases with higher (closer to the poles) latitudes.

Novaya Zemlya is a polar region in Russia. The Novaya Zemlya effect is a  mirage caused by high refraction of sunlight between atmospheric thermoclines. The Novaya Zemlya effect will give the impression that the sun is rising earlier than it actually should or the sun is setting later than it actually should.
Fridtjof Nansen wrote

Green flash

Green flash is a rare optical phenomenon that occurs during or shortly after set and during or before rise of a bright astronomical object, when a green spot is visible for a short period of time above a mirage of an astronomical object or its set/rise point.
Green flashes are enhanced by atmospheric inversions which increase the density gradient in the atmosphere, and therefore increase refraction. In other words, to see a green flash a mirage should be present.

Jules Verne described a green flash.  

Many tend to believe that seeing a green flash brings good luck.

Green flashes might be observed from any place with a low horizon. Deserts, oceans and ice shelves are probably the best places to observe mirages and therefore green flashes. It is easier not to miss a green flash during sunset than during sunrise. It is especially true regarding an inferior mirage green flash, when the timing should be just right to capture it at sunrise.
From the above observation it is clear that the author observed an inferior mirage green flash, when the much warmer surface of the desert with the help of the rising Sun was fighting the cool morning air, producing in the process a green flash – one of nature's great spectacles.

A green flash might be also seen with a rising or setting Moon.
In the right conditions it is common to observe multiple green flashes during one mock mirage sunset.Some claim they saw a green flash from Venus. This may be true, but it might be that a color of the setting or the rising planet is mistaken for a real green flash that is a by-product of a mirage.

Green rim

As an astronomical object sets or rises, the light it emits travels through the atmosphere, which works as a prism separating the light into different colors. The color of the upper limb of an astronomical object could go from blue to green to violet depending on the decrease in concentration of pollutants as they spread throughout an increasing volume of atmosphere. The lower limb of an astronomical object is always red.

The green rim is very thin, and is difficult or impossible to see with the naked eye. In usual conditions a green rim of an astronomical object gets fainter, when an astronomical object is very low above the horizon because of atmospheric reddening, but sometimes the conditions are right to see a green rim just above the horizon.

The following quote describes probably the longest observation of a green rim, which sometimes could have been a green flash. Members of Richard E. Byrd's party from the Little America exploration base saw the phenomenon on and off for 35 minutes (source for 30 versus 35 minutes?).

Often the green rim of the setting Sun will change to a green flash and then back again to a green rim during the same sunset. The image to the right might accurately illustrate what members of Byrd's party from the Little America base might have seen.

However, to see a green rim and green flash on and off for 35 minutes, there must have been some degree of mirage present.

A green rim is present in every sunset, but it is too thin to be seen with a naked eye. The best time to observe the green rim is about 10 minutes before sunset time. However, the solar disc is too bright at that time to use magnification, such as binoculars or telescopes, to look directly at the Sun. Of course, a telescope or binoculars image can be projected on a sheet of paper for viewing. When the Sun gets closer to the horizon, the green rim gets fainter because of atmospheric reddening. Although a green rim is present in every sunset, and a green flash is rare because it requires a mirage to be present, it is actually more common for people to have seen a green flash rather than a green rim.

Not a mirage

The composite image on the left is made out of five frames of different sunsets. None of the images is a mirage. Frames # 1 and # 2 could fool even a very experienced observer. They do look like a mock mirage of the setting Sun, but they are not. Frames #3 and # 4 are clearly not a mirage. Frame # 5 is not a mirage and not even a sunspot, it is a spider with the Sun as a background. The strange shapes of the Sun in this composite is due to vog and clouds.
Numerous atmospheric effects, such as vog, clouds, smoke, smog and others could generate a mirage like appearance of an astronomical object.  Lens flares and ghost images also might be responsible for a false mirage or a false green flash.

See also
 Gravitational lens, which is believed to cause a similarly duplicate image of galaxies
 Refraction
 Atmospheric refraction
 Looming and similar refraction phenomena

References

External links
All kind of mirages explained, Andrew T. Young's page with comprehensive explanations and simulations.
 A Green Flash Page, Andrew T. Young's page with comprehensive explanations and simulations.
 Green Flash – Atmospheric Optics, explanations and image gallery, Les Cowley's Atmospheric Optics site.

Gallery

Atmospheric optical phenomena